The NBA G League, formerly known as the National Basketball Development League (NBDL) and NBA Development League (D-League), presents 11 annual awards to recognize its teams, players, and coaches for their accomplishments. This does not include the G League championship trophy, which is given to the winning team of the G League Finals.

Team trophies

Current

Former

Honors

Individual awards

Current

Former

See also
List of National Basketball Association awards

References